Haliotis semiplicata, common name the semiplicate abalone, is a species of sea snail, a marine gastropod mollusk in the family Haliotidae, the abalones.

Description
The size of the shell varies between 30 mm and 60 mm.

Distribution
This marine species occurs off Western Australia.

References

 Menke, C.T. 1843. Molluscorum Novae Hollandiae Specimen in Libraria Aulica Hahniana. Hannoverae : Libraria Aulica Hahniana pp. 1–46.
 Reeve, L.A. 1846. Descriptions of forty species of Haliotis, from the collection of H. Cumming, Esq. Proceedings of the Zoological Society of London 14: 53–59
 Wilson, B. 1993. Australian Marine Shells. Prosobranch Gastropods. Kallaroo, Western Australia : Odyssey Publishing Vol. 1 408 pp.
 Geiger D.L. & Poppe G.T. (2000). A Conchological Iconography: The family Haliotidae. Conchbooks, Hackenheim Germany. 135pp. 83pls.
 Geiger, D.L. 2000 [1999]. Distribution and biogeography of the recent Haliotidae (Gastropoda: Vetigastropoda) world-wide. Bollettino Malacologico 35(5–12): 57-120 
 Geiger D.L. & Owen B. (2012) Abalone: Worldwide Haliotidae. Hackenheim: Conchbooks. viii + 361 pp. page(s): 124

External links
 

semiplicata
Gastropods of Australia
Gastropods described in 1843